Taylon Nicolas Correa Marcolino (born 16 March 1995), or simply Taylon,  is a Brazilian professional footballer who plays as a forward for Kuwaiti Division One club Burgan.

Career
On 25 June 2019, Taylon Correa signed a two-year contract with Botev Plovdiv, playing five times for the club before leaving by mutual consent on 26 August 2019.

On 18 September 2019 Taylon Correa confirmed, that he had joined Al Urooba in the United Arab Emirates.

References

External links
Taylon Correa at playmakerstats.com (English version of ogol.com.br)

1995 births
Living people
Brazilian footballers
Brazilian expatriate footballers
Associação Atlética Internacional (Limeira) players
Hibernians F.C. players
Botev Plovdiv players
Al Urooba Club players
Criciúma Esporte Clube players
Valletta F.C. players
Al-Okhdood Club players
Persita Tangerang players
First Professional Football League (Bulgaria) players
UAE First Division League players
Saudi Second Division players
Saudi First Division League players
Liga 1 (Indonesia) players
Expatriate footballers in Malta
Brazilian expatriate sportspeople in Malta
Expatriate footballers in Bulgaria
Brazilian expatriate sportspeople in Bulgaria
Expatriate footballers in the United Arab Emirates
Brazilian expatriate sportspeople in the United Arab Emirates
Brazilian expatriate sportspeople in Saudi Arabia
Expatriate footballers in Saudi Arabia
Brazilian expatriate sportspeople in Indonesia
Expatriate footballers in Indonesia
Association football forwards